Bere Point is a regional park in British Columbia, Canada, located on Malcolm Island in the Queen Charlotte Strait region of the Central Coast.

The park is located six kilometers North from downtown Sointula. The park hosts approximately 30 campsites and a group campsite located on the waterfront on the north shore of Malcolm Island. 

The campground provides access to Beautiful Bay Trail which runs 5km to Malcolm Point. There are public whale watching platforms situated along the trail to observe occasional rubbing behaviour by Orca whales on the rock beaches.

References

External links

Bere Point Park, Campground & the Beautiful Bay Trail

Regional parks of Canada
Central Coast of British Columbia